Austromitra rosenbergi is a species of sea snail, a marine gastropod mollusk, in the family Costellariidae, the ribbed miters.

Distribution
This species occurs in Vema Seamount.

References

rosenbergi